was a Japanese football player. He played for Japan national team. His brother Akira Nozawa also played for Japan national team.

National team career
Nozawa was born in Hiroshima Prefecture. In May 1930, when he was a Tokyo Imperial University student, he was selected Japan national team for 1930 Far Eastern Championship Games in Tokyo and Japan won the championship. At this competition, on May 25, he debuted against Philippines. On May 29, he also played against Republic of China. He played 2 games for Japan in 1930.

National team statistics

References

External links
 
 Japan National Football Team Database

Year of birth missing
Year of death missing
University of Tokyo alumni
Association football people from Hiroshima Prefecture
Japanese footballers
Japan international footballers
Association football midfielders